Reference intake may refer to:

See also